The Penn Quakers fencing team is the intercollegiate fencing team for the University of Pennsylvania, located in Philadelphia, Pennsylvania. The team competes in the Ivy League, within the NCAA Division I.

The university first fielded a team in 1925. The team is currently coached by Andy Ma, former coach of several members of the Chinese National Fencing Team.

History
Penn has historically fielded a strong fencing team, capturing the national title three times since the program's inception in 1925. The program has produced 11 Olympians, most recently Cliff Bayer and Tamir Bloom in 2000.

Notable former fencers
Notable alumni include:
Cliff Bayer (born 1977), 2-time Olympian, NCAA foil champion, 4-time US Champion
Tamir Bloom (born 1971), 2-time Olympian 
Harold Van Buskirk (1894-1980), 3-time Olympian, US epee champion
Paul Friedberg (born 1959), Olympian, 3-time NCAA saber champion, Maccabiah Games champion, Pan American Games champion.
 Shaul Gordon (born 1994), Canadian-Israeli Olympic sabre fencer
Brooke Makler (1951–2010), Olympian, NCAA foil champion. 2-time Pan American Games champion.
Paul Makler, Jr. (born 1946), Olympian, 2-time NCAA champion
 Paul Makler Sr. (born 1920), Olympian
Dave Micahnik (born 1938), 3-time Olympian, US epee champion, 3-time Maccabiah Games champion
Steve Netburn (born 1943), 2-time Olympian
Chris O'Loughlin (born 1967), Olympian, NCAA epee champion, US epee champion, Maccabiah Games silver medalist, Pan American Games bronze medalist
J. Brooks B. Parker (1889–1951), 2-time Olympian

Year-by-year results

Championships

Conference championships

References

External links
 

 
Sports clubs established in 1925
1925 establishments in Pennsylvania